Sir Edward James Dodd, CBE, OStJ, QPM (19 October 1909 – 16 September 1966) was Chief Inspector of Constabulary from 1963 until his death.

Dodd was educated at Reading School and HMS Conway. He served with the Merchant Navy and the Royal Naval Reserve from 1925 to 1931. He was with the Metropolitan Police from 1931 to 1941. He was the 2nd Assistant Chief Constable of the Birmingham City Police from 1941 to 1944, the 1st Assistant Chief Constable from 1944 to 1945 and Chief Constable from 1945 to 1963.

References

British Chief Constables
English recipients of the Queen's Police Medal
Commanders of the Order of the British Empire
Knights Bachelor
Chief Inspectors of Constabulary (England and Wales)
People educated at Reading School
1909 births
1966 deaths
Officers of the Order of St John
British Merchant Navy personnel
Royal Naval Volunteer Reserve personnel
People educated aboard HMS Conway
Royal Naval Reserve personnel